Hilary Elizabeth Farr (née Labow) is a British-Canadian designer, businesswoman, television host and former actress. She is known as the co-host of the HGTV and W Network television series Love It or List It with David Visentin.

Born in Toronto and raised in London, Farr began her career in Los Angeles working as a home renovator as well as designing film and television sets. During this time, she occasionally worked as an actress, appearing in minor roles in such films as The Rocky Horror Picture Show (1975), City on Fire (1979), and The Return (1980).

She continued to work in home renovation and design in the ensuing years before establishing herself as a designer and co-host of Love It or List It in 2010. She is president of Hilary Farr's Designs, established in Toronto and in New York City.

Early life
Farr was born in Toronto, Ontario, Canada to a British mother and a Canadian father. Her mother was an Anglican and a member of the Church of England, and her father was Jewish. Farr was raised celebrating both Jewish and Christian religious traditions.

Farr was raised in London, where she attended the Royal Ballet School until age 11, and aspired to have a career as a ballerina. She took an interest in theatre and was introduced to interior design by helping her mother to decorate her childhood home.

Career
Farr began her career in Los Angeles, where she began purchasing and renovating homes, as well working as a film and television set designer. Acting under the name Hilary Labow, Farr made small appearances in Layout for 5 Models (1972), Sex Farm (1973), Never Mind the Quality, Feel the Width (1973), Legend of the Werewolf (1975), The Rocky Horror Picture Show (1975), City on Fire (1979) and The Return (1980). She also performed a singing role in Grease in London in 1973. In the early 1980s, she had small parts in television sitcoms.

Farr designed and renovated properties in Australia, the United Kingdom, California, New York and later Toronto. She renovated homes for notable celebrities, including Jenna Elfman's home and Jennifer Hudson's loft in Chicago.

Farr returned to Toronto in 2008 after a divorce. She was signed as a co-host of Love It or List It by the W Network, Big Coat Productions and Corus Entertainment, along with David Visentin. The show was broadcast on HGTV and W Network. In Spain, the show was broadcast with a dual soundtrack on Divinity.

Farr also served as a judge on W Network's Search for the Next W Expert 2010. In 2011, she made a number of guest appearances at the Canadian International Interior Design Show, hosted in the cities of Toronto, Edmonton and Vancouver. She also made guest appearances on The Marilyn Denis Show and is a regular contributor to the Huffington Post.

In June 2014, Farr was a guest and design expert along with CNN and USA Today pundit and journalist Amy Tara Koch at the Art Van Furniture convention in Orland Park and Chicago, Illinois.

In 2016, Farr appeared in Ross Petty's stage version of Sleeping Beauty at the Elgin Theatre in Toronto, in the role of Malignicent. (Although the character is more commonly known as Maleficent, she was renamed "Malignicent" for this production.)

In 2017, Farr co-founded Rules of Renovation, a real estate investment seminar series held at locations across North America for aspiring investors.

Personal life
Farr married Canadian TV producer Gordon Farr in 1982. She gave birth to their son, Joshua, in Los Angeles on 7 March 1983. The couple divorced in 2008.

Farr has noted she has a passion for animal rescue, and in 2017 volunteered in Nairobi with an organization protecting orphaned elephants.

In December 2021, Farr revealed publicly for the first time that she had been diagnosed with and treated for breast cancer in 2014. She had previously been diagnosed with a precancerous tumor in 2012, which she had surgically removed. A subsequent mammogram revealed Farr had developed malignant breast cancer. She underwent radiation therapy and further surgical intervention, but, as of 2022, is in remission.

Filmography

References

External links

Living people
British interior designers
British television presenters
Businesspeople from London
Businesspeople from Toronto
Canadian interior designers
Canadian stage actresses
Canadian television hosts
Canadian women television hosts
Canadian emigrants to England
Canadian expatriates in England
Love It or List It
People educated at the Royal Ballet School